Megadictyon is a genus of Cambrian lobopodian with similarities to Jianshanopodia and Siberion.
Occasionally mis-spelt Magadictyon.

Megadictyon is a large lobopodian, with body length (excluding appendages) possibly up to 20 centimeters in total. The head has a pair of robust frontal appendages associated with rows of spine and terminal claws. Underside the head is a radiodont-like mouthpart forming by multiple layers of plates and teeth-like structures. The trunk is wide and annulated, with a pair of well-developed lobopodous limbs on each body segment. Only 8 segment/limb pairs are countable in the incomplete fossil materials which lacking posterior region, so it may have had more (possibly up to 11 to 13) in nature. It also has pairs of digestive glands similar to those of basal arthropods.

References

Lobopodia